The 13th Pan American Games were held in Winnipeg, Manitoba, Canada from July 23 to August 8, 1999.

Medals

Gold

Men's Heavyweight (– 105 kg): Boris Burov

Silver

Men's Middleweight (– 77 kg): Walter Llerena
Men's Light-Heavyweight (– 85 kg): José Llerena

Bronze

Men's 20 km Road Walk: Jefferson Pérez

Men's Light Flyweight (– 48 kg): Patricio Calero
  

Women's Heavyweight (+ 78 kg): Carmen Chalá

Men's Kumite (– 70 kg): William Preciado
  

Men's Middleweight (– 80 kg): Cristian Peñafiel

See also
 Ecuador at the 2000 Summer Olympics

References
 Ecuadorian Olympic Committee

Nations at the 1999 Pan American Games
P
1999